Tirumakudalu Narasipura Balakrishna (2 November 1911 – 18 July 1995), commonly known an T. N. Balakrishna or Balanna, was an Indian actor in the Kannada film industry. He was said to have a hearing problem and some say that he was totally deaf. However, he would catch the lip movements of the artists and would narrate the dialogues spontaneously. He was popular for his comic and villainous roles in films like kantheredu nodu (1961), Muriyada Mane (1964), Bangaarada Manushya (1972), Gandhada Gudi (1973)  and Kaamana Billu (1983) and  appeared in numerous versatile roles over a hundred films that starred Rajkumar in the lead role.

Balakrishna is known to have played the most roles in Kannada cinema, having appeared in over 560 films as a hero, villain, comedian, good Samaritan, loving father and lunatic. Sudha Chandran is his ex-daughter in law.

Early life
Balakrishna was born into a poor family on 2 November 1911 in Arsikere, Kingdom of Mysore. When he was four years old, his mother sold him to a couple for just 8 in order to provide treatment for her ailing husband. He ran away from his adopted parents after having been treated badly.

In his later years Balakrishna had lung cancer and finally succumbed to it on 18 July 1995 at the age of 83. Yama Kinkara was his last film appearance.

Career
Balakrishna first acted in the play, Shri Rama Pattabhishekha, in 1929. Following this, he worked as the painter of the stage backdrops for a drama company before becoming a professional sign painter. Later, he became a ticket collector in a drama company for a meagre salary. He returned to acting in theatre with Lakshmasana Drama Company and then with Gowrishankar Nataka Mandali. Following this, he joined the drama company of Gubbi Veeranna, a notable theatre director during the time. Film director B. R. Panthulu happened to visit the drama company, saw his acting on stage and offered him a film role, beginning his career as a movie actor. He appeared as an antagonist in the film Kalachakra, a performance that was appreciated. He appeared in over a hundred Kannada films playing mostly comic roles, that starred Rajkumar.

In order to make the Kannada film industry self-reliant and save money for the producers, he started the studio, investing all of his money and property. He built the Abhiman studio in Kengeri, Bangalore on a 20-acre plot in 1963, but faced difficulties initially.

When no Kannada films were being made, he got together with other actors like Rajkumar and G. V. Iyer and produced the film Ranadheera Kanteerava. He even raised money from the public at 1 per person to build the studio. The studio was a failure, and Balanna died in penury. Television serials are still being shot at the studio today which is being looked after by Balakrishna's son, B. Ganesh and grandson Karthik.

Notable filmography

References

External links
 
 

Male actors in Kannada cinema
1911 births
Male actors from Karnataka
Indian male film actors
20th-century Indian male actors
1995 deaths
Indian deaf people
Male deaf actors
People from Hassan district
Kannada male actors